The Jewish Institute for the Deaf was founded in 1876 in Budapest, Hungary.

The institute was closed in 1944 because of World War II.

The institute's building has long since become a synagogue and center of Jewish community.

Institute people 
The school was attended by Izrael Zachariah Deutsch around the time of the Holocaust.
Dezső Kanizsai taught at the institute starting in 1907.

References 

Buildings and structures in Budapest
Schools for the deaf
Synagogues in Budapest
Jewish organisations based in Hungary